The 1937 International Lawn Tennis Challenge was the 32nd edition of what is now known as the Davis Cup. 20 teams entered the Europe Zone, while 4 teams entered the Americas Zone.

The United States defeated Australia in the Americas Zone final, while in the Europe Zone final Germany defeated Czechoslovakia. The United States defeated Germany in the Inter-Zonal play-off, and then defeated Great Britain in the Challenge Round. The final was played at the All England Club Centre Court in Wimbledon, London, England on 24–27 July.

America Zone

Draw

Final
United States vs. Australia

Europe Zone

Draw

Final
Germany vs. Czechoslovakia

Inter-Zonal Final
United States vs. Germany

Challenge Round
Great Britain vs. United States

See also
 1937 Wightman Cup

References

External links
Davis Cup official website

Davis Cups by year
 
International Lawn Tennis Challenge
International Lawn Tennis Challenge
International Lawn Tennis Challenge
International Lawn Tennis Challenge
1937 in English tennis